Hildeprand was the Duke of Spoleto from 774 to 789.

When Theodicius of Spoleto died fighting at the Siege of Pavia in 774, the Lombards of the Duchy of Spoleto elected Hildeprand their duke and quickly submitted to the Franks. Hildeprand fled to Rome before the Frankish host and did homage to Pope Hadrian I. However, the dispute between Charlemagne and Hadrian as to who had the proper suzerainty over Spoleto was solved in the Franks' favour over the next few years. In January 776, Hildeprandus gloriosus et summus dux ducatus Spoletani made a donation to the Abbey of Farfa dating it to the year of Charles' reign. This form was continued in 777 with language implicitly excluding papal suzerainty.

In 775, Hadrian alleged that Hildeprand had joined a conspiracy of Hrodgaud of Friuli and Arechis II of Benevento, but there is no evidence of Hildeprand's involvement. Hildeprand remained a staunch opponent of the papacy thereafter.

In 779, Hildeprand travelled to Virciniacum (today Verzenay), probably near Compiègne, to profess fealty to Charlemagne. He brought with him gifts and left with promises that the king would protect his interests from those of the pope.

In 788, Hildeprand joined Frankish and Lombard troops in resisting a Byzantine invasion. He died the next year and was succeeded by a royal appointee: a Frank, named Winiges.

References

Sources
Hodgkin, Thomas. Italy and her Invaders. Clarendon Press: 1895.

8th-century dukes of Spoleto
Lombard warriors
8th-century births
789 deaths